Taevaskoja  is a village in Põlva Parish, Põlva County in southeastern Estonia, known for its outcrops of Devonian sandstone on the banks of Ahja river.

References

Villages in Põlva County
Tourist attractions in Põlva County